The Children's Book of the Year Award: Early Childhood has been presented annually since 2001 by the Children's Book Council of Australia (CBCA).

The Award "will be made to outstanding books of fiction, drama, poetry or concept books for children who are at pre-reading or early stages of reading.  They may be picture books, picture storybooks or texts in which illustrations play a substantial part in the storytelling or concept development."

Award winners

2000s

2010s

2020s

See also 

 List of CBCA Awards
 List of Australian literary awards

External links
 CBCA Awards History

References

Awards established in 2001
2001 establishments in Australia
Children's Book Council of Australia
English-language literary awards
Children's literary awards